José Luis Fuentes Bustamante (born 2 March 1985) is a Venezuelan artistic gymnast, representing his nation at international competitions.  He participated at the 2008 Summer Olympics in Beijing, China.

References

1985 births
Living people
Venezuelan male artistic gymnasts
Place of birth missing (living people)
Gymnasts at the 2007 Pan American Games
Gymnasts at the 2015 Pan American Games
Gymnasts at the 2008 Summer Olympics
Olympic gymnasts of Venezuela
Pan American Games medalists in gymnastics
Pan American Games gold medalists for Venezuela
Pan American Games silver medalists for Venezuela
South American Games gold medalists for Venezuela
South American Games silver medalists for Venezuela
South American Games bronze medalists for Venezuela
South American Games medalists in gymnastics
Competitors at the 2002 South American Games
Competitors at the 2006 South American Games
Competitors at the 2010 South American Games
21st-century Venezuelan people